KBOO is a non-profit organization, listener-funded FM Community radio station broadcasting from Portland, Oregon. The station's mission is to serve groups in its listening area who are underrepresented on other local radio stations and to provide access to the airwaves for people who have unconventional or controversial tastes and points of view. It broadcasts 24 hours a day, seven days a week, and has been on the air since 1968.

KBOO is supported financially by donations from members and a small endowment. As of February 2022, the station had about 9,200 members. The station runs pledge drives twice each year. The annual KBOO budget in 2022 was about $900,000.

The station is run by eleven paid staff members and several hundred volunteers. Its offices and broadcast studios are in a converted warehouse in inner Southeast Portland, purchased in 1982. Its main transmitter power output is 10,000 watts (approximately 26,500 watts after antenna gain) in Portland; KBOO also has two repeater stations – in Philomath, Oregon (at 104.3 FM) and the Columbia River Gorge (at 91.9 FM)—which extend its broadcast area to include the Columbia River Gorge and most of the Willamette Valley.

History

Early Days (1964–1971)
A group of Portlanders organized themselves as Portland Listener Supported Radio in 1964. They approached Lorenzo Milam, a former volunteer at Pacifica Radio's KPFA, who helped start KRAB, a now-defunct community station in Seattle.

Milam agreed to help them organize a station, and after a series of meetings, Portland Listener Supported Radio applied for a license for a Portland radio station. In time, Milam helped several other communities start their own stations, including KCHU, WAIF, WORT, KDNA, KTAO, and KUSP.

Milam asked KRAB volunteer David Calhoun if he'd be willing to help organize the new station in Portland. Calhoun, an ex-monk and third-year medical student, packed his VW with a transmitter from Seattle, and moved south.

Sleeping on couches and bumming meals, Calhoun and other volunteers including Gray Haertig (who continues to volunteer to this day) put together what was needed for a community radio station. A basement room was donated on Third and Salmon Streets, in downtown Portland. The space was barely big enough for two tape recorders, one turntable, and Calhoun. A diverse mix of about thirty volunteers came together to help out, including society women, movement radicals, professional broadcast engineers, and musicians.

Selecting call letters referencing a strain of marijuana called "Berkeley Boo", KBOO Community Radio was on the air in June 1968, at a cost of less than $4,000. The total monthly station budget was about $50. The total output was only ten watts - not quite that of a light bulb. A new and important force on Portland's airwaves was born.

Initially, KBOO was on the air whenever there was a volunteer to flip a switch and activate the repeater signal from KRAB. But almost immediately, the station began to grow. KBOO volunteers lugged big Ampex tape recorders to concerts, political events, and neighborhood meetings; nationally recognized artists and activists were brought into the KBOO studio. Local poets also discovered they had an electronic outlet.

By the summer of 1970, a used 1,000-watt transmitter was installed, enabling KBOO's audience and subscriptions to grow. KBOO could be heard in much of Northwest Oregon.

After three years, KBOO outgrew its studio, and moved to a storefront on SE Belmont Street near 31st Avenue. Walls of the makeshift studios were lined with egg cartons for sound insulation. Two desks were shared by everyone.

Incorporation and stability (1972–1982)
By 1972, the non-profit KBOO Foundation was born, with an interim five-member Board of Directors. The umbilical cord to KRAB was being cut. By 1973, the staff had grown to five, with about 50 active volunteers. About 600 subscribers donated an average of $20 a year. Station Manager John Ross got an $80,000 federal grant to help purchase equipment.

In 1975, the 800-strong KBOO Foundation elected its first board of Directors. The KBOO Foundation and its officers got the license and ownership of the station. KBOO became fully independent of KRAB and its parent, the Jack Straw Memorial Foundation. After 10 years, KBOO had come of age.

The station moved again, in 1977, to SW Yamhill Street, and soon expanded broadcasting to 24 hours a day on a regularly scheduled basis. KBOO was broadcasting at 12,500 watts. Rapid growth came to KBOO in its new downtown location. Subscribers soared from 1,200 in early 1978 to well above 2,000 by 1980. About 300 volunteers gave KBOO one of the strongest volunteer programs in the nation.

In 1981, urban renewal in downtown Portland forced a search for a new home. KBOO found its present location at 20 SE 8th Avenue (the little robin's egg blue building half a block south of East Burnside Street behind the Jupiter Hotel and Doug Fir Lounge). Through a massive volunteer effort, a new station was built in 1982 in an empty warehouse. For the first time, KBOO would own its own home.

Expansion (1982–present)

In the early '80s, KBOO broadened its commitment to multicultural programming. New Spanish and Asian-language programs were added. A strip of African-American musical programming was added in 1981. A Hispanic strip followed in 1984. News and Public Affairs Director Ross Reynolds and volunteers teamed up to organize a nightly newscast, supplemented by a new wire service and national newscast from Pacifica Radio, which proudly continues to air to this day. A new station, KMUN, was launched in Astoria through KBOO's help, much as KRAB had nurtured KBOO. Funds were raised to purchase the new building and KBOO was in the black for the first time in memory.

In 1986, the building was purchased. Power was boosted to 23 kW, and KBOO began broadcasting in stereo for the first time. A major federal grant in 1987 allowed purchase of new studio equipment. A satellite dish was added on the roof, and the station bought a remote transmitter, allowing live remote broadcasts of community events.

In the early 1990s, KBOO set up translators in Corvallis (broadcasting at 100.7 FM) and in White Salmon, Washington (broadcasting at 91.9 FM), allowing KBOO's signal to be received from the very northern tip of Eugene to The Dalles, on a good day. In 2013, the Corvallis translator moved slightly, to Philomath, where it still reaches Corvallis and now parts of Eugene, at 104.3 FM.

In the summer of 1991, KBOO moved its transmitter to a new location on the  KGON tower (also known as Stonehenge) on Portland's West Hills. This increase of  gave KBOO much greater range. KBOO's effective radiated power was boosted to 26.5 kW. Reports from jubilant listeners came in from the coast and outskirts of Eugene, saying they were hearing KBOO clearly for the first time.

Programming
KBOO offers a wide spectrum of programming on a regular basis, as well as annual and one-time special event programming.

Regular programs are either music/culture or public affairs. KBOO's public affairs programming offers morning talk shows, daytime cultural programs, as well as educational, informative and controversial productions. The main focus is broadcasting independent content, and voices/perspectives that are not typically heard on mainstream media. Public affairs programs include: Old Mole Variety Hour, Voices For The Animals, Prison Pipeline, Art Focus, Film at 11, Locus Focus, The Dirtbag, The Bike Show and Rose City Native Radio. Also included are limited series such as Roe On The Rocks, tackling current gender and political issues of national relevance, and Let’s Talk About Race, addressing racial and social issues of importance. Distinctive programming, such as specialized starseed, public affairs content is also offered, namely Squirrels Know. 

KBOO delivers a daily volunteer-produced evening newscast, and dedicated election coverages. It has hosted the Walt Curtis poetry show Talking Earth since 1971. KBOO also broadcasts syndicated programs, such as Democracy Now!, For The Wild, Ecojustice Radio and First Voices Radio. Music programs, which cover a vast array of genres from hip-hop, rock, electronica, experimental, chill-out, folk, jazz, latin music and world, can be heard from noon to 4pm each weekday, as well as most evenings, late nights and weekends. Music shows include: Roots of Rock and Roll, Jazz in the Afternoon, Rise When The Rooster Crows, Dr. Zomb’s Stereo Obscura, Spark Plug, Parsing Sound and Boogie Pachangero. In addition, KBOO also offers radio theater programs, including The Ubu Hour, Sudden Radio Project and Gremlin Time, with each program alternating from week-to-week, producing one episode per month.

Special programming events have included live remote broadcasts of music festivals such as PDX Pop Now!, Pickathon, and the annual Waterfront Blues Festival.

According to the KBOO Programming Charter, KBOO shall fill the needs that other media outlets do not, "providing programming to diverse communities and unserved or underserved groups" and "shall provide access and training to those communities."

KBOO hosted the Grassroots Radio Coalition's 13th annual Grassroots Radio Conference. The conference was held July 24–27, 2008, at Portland State University's Native American Student and Community Center.  It was co-sponsored by KBOO, KPSU, and KPCN-LP.

"Stairway to Heaven"
As a listener-funded station, KBOO runs a variety of fundraising offers. They once promised that, for a donation of $10,000, the station would never play "Stairway To Heaven" again. After his last set at the Aladdin Theater, Robert Plant was driving his rental car to the Oregon Coast and station-surfing, looking for non-mainstream music. That is, of course, a KBOO specialty, and the offer was repeated while Plant was lingering on the station. He liked the idea and decided to accept. He pulled over to use a pay-phone to call and make a $10,000 pledge, which he says he did using the credit card of Atco Records president Herb Abramson. 

During an interview in which Plant confirmed the story, he also said that he liked the song well enough, and of course it has been very good to him... "…but don’t you know, I’ve heard it."

See also
List of community radio stations in the United States

References

External links

Community radio stations in the United States
BOO
Radio stations established in 1968
1968 establishments in Oregon